Matt Brennan (born 16 October 1936) is a retired Irish Fianna Fáil politician who was a Teachta Dála (TD) for the Sligo–Leitrim constituency. Brennan was first elected to Dáil Éireann on his second attempt at the February 1982 general election and retained his seat until retiring at the 2002 general election.

His father, Peter, was a founding member of Fianna Fáil and his uncle, Martin Brennan, also represented Sligo from 1938 to 1948. Matt Brennan was a member of Sligo County Council between 1974 and 1999, representing the Tubbercurry area.

See also
Families in the Oireachtas

References

1936 births
Living people
Fianna Fáil TDs
Members of the 23rd Dáil
Members of the 24th Dáil
Members of the 25th Dáil
Members of the 26th Dáil
Members of the 27th Dáil
Members of the 28th Dáil
Local councillors in County Sligo